John Abbey (born June 21, 1935) is an American born actor best known for portraying the title role in the French film Mr. Freedom, directed by fellow American expatriate William Klein. Born in Denver, Colorado in 1935, Abbey appeared in a few uncredited roles in American and English films before coming to France, where he played American characters in film and television throughout the 1960s and 1970s. He has since retired from acting. He spoke fluent French as well.

In addition to Mr. Freedom, Abbey is known for his supporting role as Mr Lacs in Jacques Tati's 1967 film Playtime.

References

External links

1935 births
American expatriate male actors in France
Living people
American expatriate male actors in the United Kingdom